Titanic Museum may refer to:

 RMS Titanic Inc. operates multiple traveling exhibits titled Titanic: The Artifact Exhibition
 Southampton's Titanic Story at SeaCity Museum, Southampton, England
 The Titanic Museum, operated by the Titanic Historical Society in Indian Orchard, Massachusetts
 The Titanic Exhibits at Maritime Museum of the Atlantic in Halifax, Nova Scotia, Canada
 Titanic Museum (Branson, Missouri), attraction museum in Branson, Missouri
 Titanic Museum (Pigeon Forge, Tennessee), attraction museum in Pigeon Forge, Tennessee
 Titanic Belfast, a visitor attraction on the site where the ship was built in Belfast, Northern Ireland